The Cincinnati Bearcats men's basketball program represents the University of Cincinnati in Cincinnati, Ohio. The school's team competes in NCAA Division I as part of the American Athletic Conference though they will move to the Big 12 conference (Big XII)  within the next few years. The Bearcats are currently coached by Wes Miller.

With over 1800 all-time wins, the Bearcats are the 12th winningest basketball programs of all-time. The school's merits include 2 National Titles, 6 Final Fours, and 33 NCAA Division I men's basketball tournament appearances. As of 2019, Cincinnati had an all-time tournament record of 46–32. There have also been 42 All-American honors issued to Bearcats as well, while 36 have gone on to play in the NBA.

Cincinnati has been playing its home games since 1989 at Fifth Third Arena, which received an $87 million renovation for the 2018 season. The Bearcats played their 2017–18 season at BB&T Arena on the campus of Northern Kentucky University in Highland Heights, Kentucky while their home arena was renovated. Cincinnati joined the original Big East Conference in 2005, which was rebranded as the American Athletic Conference (AAC) in 2013. They recently accepted an invitation to join the Big 12 conference.

By the numbers
Statistics and NCAA all-time rankings (through the end of the 2021–22 season):
 Wins: 1885 (14th)
 Win percentage: .640 (16th)
 National Titles: 2 (T-10th)
 Final Fours: 6 (T-12th)
 NCAA Tournament appearances: 33 (T-18th)
 NCAA Tournament games played: 78 (16th)
 NCAA Tournament wins: 46 (17th)
 Weeks in the AP Top 25: 433 (12th)
 Weeks in the AP Top 10: 210 (15th)
 Weeks at No. 1 in the AP Poll: 45 (7th)
 14 consecutive NCAA Tournament appearances from 1992 to 2005 (T-11th longest streak all-time)
 10 consecutive NCAA Tournament appearances from 2011–2019 
 First-team Consensus All-American selections: 8 (T-22nd)
 Current players in the NBA: 1 
 First school to reach three consecutive National Title games (1961–63)
 First school to reach five consecutive Final Fours (1959–63)

History

1901-1940s – The beginning
Basketball formally debuted as a selected varsity team in 1901 and played nine games. Cincinnati, in its first season lost to Yale but later defeated a team from the University of Kentucky while compiling a 5–4 record, with the remaining games being against non-collegiate teams. Home games during this time were played in a gym in the basement of McMicken Hall. Pillars on the court gave UC a home court advantage. UC experienced moderate success in the early days, with the main highlights being them winning several conference championships in both the Buckeye Athletic Association and the Mid-American Conference.

1954–1958 – The start of something special
Cincinnati opened its new on-campus arena, Armory Fieldhouse, with a 97–65 win over Indiana in 1954. One of the first of Cincinnati's long list of standouts was Jack Twyman, who earned All-America status in 1954–55. He went on to NBA stardom and is in the Basketball Hall of Fame.
Oscar Robertson made his debut in 1957, and quickly emerged as one of the top college players in the country. "The Big O" is still widely recognized as one of the greatest to ever play the sport—college or professional. A unanimous three-time All-American, he was college basketball's all-time leading scorer at the close of his career. His 33.8 scoring average today ranks third on the NCAA career charts, and he has the NBA's third-most career assists. The Bearcats celebrated their entry into the Missouri Valley Conference by winning the league title. Cincinnati made its first NCAA tournament appearance in 1958, losing to Kansas State in overtime at the Midwest Regional.

1958–1964 – A run unlike any other

Sparked by the exploits of Robertson, who became the first player to lead the nation in scoring in three consecutive seasons, Cincinnati advanced to the Final Four in 1958–59 and 1959–60, settling for third place both years. Then the Bearcats, with a rookie head coach (Ed Jucker) and without Robertson, won their first national title in 1960–61. Then to prove that its 1961 championship was no fluke, UC repeated as national champion in 1961–62. Cincinnati made a fifth-straight trip to the Final Four in 1962–63, and narrowly missed capturing a third-straight national crown when the Loyola Ramblers overcame a 15-point deficit and defeated the Bearcats by a basket, 60–58, in overtime.

During those five seasons, UC recorded a 37-game win streak and posted a 161–16 ledger. The five straight Final Four appearances is a feat topped only by UCLA. Connie Dierking (1958), Ralph Davis (1960), Bob Wiesenhahn (1961), Paul Hogue (1961, 1962), Tom Thacker (1963), Tony Yates (1963), Ron Bonham (1963, 1964) and George Wilson (1963) were accorded All-American recognition with Wilson playing on the U.S. 1964 Olympic gold medal team.

1970s – Continued success
The Bearcats during the 1970s compiled a 170–85 record (.667). The success was led by flashy-dressing head coach Gale Catlett, who led the Bearcats to the NCAA tournament in the 1974–75 season returning Cincinnati to the Big Dance for the first time since the 1965–66 season. Cincinnati inaugurated the Metro Conference by winning the league's first two tournament championships and made four consecutive post-season appearances from 1974 to 1977, including a Sweet Sixteen appearance in 1975. Catlett was also a skilled recruiter, bringing Jim Ard (1970), Lloyd Batts (1973), Steve Collier (1976), Gary Yoder (1977), Bob Miller (1978) and Pat Cummings (1979) to Cincinnati who all earned All-American recognition. Cummings closed his career as UC's No. 2 leading scorer of all-time.

After the 1977–78 campaign Catlett would leave to coach his alma mater West Virginia and Cincinnati hired Chicago Bulls head coach Ed Badger. Badger would have middling success with the Bearcats during his tenure, which was immediately challenged when a two-year NCAA postseason ban was handed down to the Bearcats due to violations by Catlett.

1980–1988 – Down in the dumps
Cincinnati fell into exceptionally hard times during the 1980s, going 112–142 over the course of the decade. Tony Yates, a member of the national championship teams in the 1960s, was hired as head coach in 1983. In his first season in 1983–84, UC went 3–25 (0–14 in conference), the school's worst season (winning-percentage-wise) since going 1–9 in 1915. After several unremarkable campaigns thereafter, Yates was fired after the 1989 season. The Bearcats of the 1980s failed to make a single NCAA tournament, and only had one postseason appearance in the 1985 NIT.

1989–2005 – Back into the national spotlight
Bob Huggins, the former head coach at the University of Akron, was named head coach at UC prior to the 1989–90 season. Taking over a team with a proud history but one that had not had any legitimate success in over a decade, Huggins quickly turned things around and rekindled the national championship expectations of the past. Posting winning records in each of his first two seasons, Huggins would soon prove that his team was for real and in only his third season at the helm he directed UC to the 1992 Final Four. The 1992 team that went on to lose to Michigan's "Fab Five" in the Final Four, would set a high standard of success that would last for years to come. The Bearcats advanced to the Elite Eight of the NCAA tournament three times, and reached the Sweet 16 four times while Huggins was coach. Cincinnati also won its conference season and/or tournament title in 12 years out of a 13-year span (1992–2004). UC was also one of the top ranked teams of this time, often being ranked in the top 10 if not number one in the country. Huggin's team merits include claiming eight league tournament titles and 10 regular season crowns in addition to appearing in 14 consecutive NCAA Tournaments (1992–2005).

Fifteen Bearcats had garnered first team all-conference honors during this era with three of those, Danny Fortson, Kenyon Martin and Steve Logan, picking up a total of four C-USA Most Outstanding Player Awards. Fortson, Nick Van Exel, Ruben Patterson, Bobby Brannen, Melvin Levett, Logan, Martin and Pete Mickeal have joined Cincinnati's list of All-Americans. Fortson was a consensus first team All-American in 1996–97 after receiving second team recognition in 1995–96. Martin was college basketball's top player of the 1999–2000 season, making a clean sweep of the national player of the year awards. Logan was a consensus All-American in 2001–02 and a finalist for every national player of the year award. Several Bearcats were NBA Draft Picks, including Martin being the number one overall pick in 2000.

Huggins was forced to resign by school president Nancy Zimpher in August 2005. Zimpher was angered by the lackluster academic performance of Huggins' teams (he routinely only graduated 30 percent of his players), and felt that Huggins didn't fit in with her plan to upgrade UC's academic reputation. Huggins hadn't helped his standing with Zimpher when he was arrested for DUI in 2004.  This decision was met wide widespread criticism among virtually everyone connected to the program, creating a situation that would not bode well for the team in the near future. Looking to stay within the program, the school immediately promoted assistant coach Andy Kennedy as interim head coach for the 2005–06 season.

2006–2009 – Resurrecting a gutted program
In the spring of 2006, Mick Cronin was hired as head coach, replacing interim coach Andy Kennedy after the dismissal of Bob Huggins. Cronin was tasked with picking up the pieces from a depleted program after Huggins was abruptly asked to resign three months before the 2005 season, and a temporary coach in Kennedy for the previous season. Due to the school having little-to-no recruiting going on for around a full calendar year, Cronin was forced to scrounge for players. He even had a couple players on the school's football team play, one being future NFL linebacker Connor Barwin.

Although Cronin's teams struggled early in his UC career, he improved the school's win total each of his first five seasons. After two straight losing seasons, UC began to get back on track under Cronin in the 2008–09 season with an 18–14 record. This was then followed by an NIT appearance and a brief return to the Top 25 polls during the 2009–10 campaign.

2010–2019 – Return to winning ways
Despite the surroundings, Cincinnati began the retooling process, becoming the only program from a major conference to improve its win total every season from 2007 to 2011, building from 11 wins in 2007 to 26 victories and a return to the NCAA tournament in 2011.
Now a fixture at the Big Dance, Cincinnati can include itself among an elite list of six programs appearing in eight consecutive NCAA Tournaments, along with Duke, Gonzaga, Kansas, Michigan State and North Carolina. This run of 9 consecutive NCAA Tournament appearances by Cincinnati would see UC advance to the Round of 32 five times and to the Sweet 16 once as of the 2018–19 season.

During the 2014–15 season, Mick Cronin discovered he had an arterial dissection and sat out the rest of the season, last coaching December 17 against San Diego State. Assistant Coach, Larry Davis took the reins and lead the team onto a respectable season and classic overtime victory over Purdue in the first round of the NCAA tournament.

In 2013–14 season and 2017–18 season Cincinnati were American Athletic Conference regular season champions and in 2017–18 and 2018–19 seasons Cincinnati won the American Athletic Conference men's basketball tournament. During this time many notable players came to Cincinnati with several progressing to the NBA, such as Sean Kilpatrick, Troy Caupain, Jacob Evans, and Gary Clark. The Bearcats also featured consecutive AAC Player-of-the-Year (POY) winners in Gary Clark and Jarron Cumberland.

2020–present – Coaching shakeups
On April 9, 2019, it was announced that Mick Cronin would be leaving Cincinnati to become the next head coach of the UCLA Bruins after UCLA had fired Coach Steve Alford earlier in the season (ironically, his firing was due in part to a blowout loss to the Bearcats). On April 14, 2019, it was announced that John Brannen was being hired as the new head coach.

In his first year, Brannen would lead the 'Cats to a share of the regular season AAC championship before both the AAC tournament and the NCAA tournament were cancelled due to COVID-19. In Brannen's second season the team struggled to find its footing and dealt with 5 COVID related opt-outs and a 25 day program pause. The Bearcats would finish 12—11 before leading a surprising run in the 2021 AAC tournament before losing in the final.

On March 26, Athletic Director John Cunningham announced the university would begin investigating allegations against the program. Soon after on April 3, it was announced that head coach John Brannen was placed on indefinite leave. Finally, on April 9 the school announced Brannen had been relieved of his duties effective immediately along with assistants.

On April 14 Cincinnati hired Wes Miller to become their next head coach, replacing Brannen.

Notable seasons
 1959–60 Oscar Robertson scored a school record 62 points in an early-February game vs. North Texas State and in the process became the NCAA's all-time leading career scorer. Robertson claimed national player of the year honors for the third straight year while Cincinnati won its third straight Missouri Valley title. The Bearcats made their second trip to the Final Four. California again turned back UC's title hopes as UC finished third. George Smith stepped down as head coach to become athletic director, capping a career in which he posted a 154–56 record in eight years.
 1960–61 Largely an unknown team, without Robertson, and with a new head coach, Ed Jucker, in command, Cincinnati stumbled to a 5–3 start. The Bearcats then won their next 22 contests, garnering a league title, a third straight trip to the Final Four, and a national championship. In the first-ever championship game matchup of two teams from the same state, UC defeated Ohio State in overtime, 70–65.
 1961–62 Cincinnati fashioned a 28–2 record, but the Bearcats had to defeat Bradley in a league playoff game to defend their national title. UC won the Midwest Regional to earn its fourth straight trip to the Final Four. After edging UCLA, 72–70, in the semifinals, Cincinnati became a repeat champion with a 71–59 win over Ohio State. Paul Hogue was the tournament's Most Outstanding Player.
 1962–63 UC breezed to its fifth straight Missouri Valley Conference crown and, after winning the Midwest Regional, a fifth straight trip to the Final Four. An 80–46 win over Oregon State in the semifinals put the Bearcats in position to win a third straight national title. Cincinnati held a 15-point lead over Loyola (Ill.) in the second half of the championship game, only to have the Ramblers come back to win, 60–58, in overtime. Cincinnati led the nation in defense.
 1991–92 The Bearcats opened play in the Great Midwest Conference and marked their debut in this new league by sharing the regular season title and winning the tournament crown. Cincinnati made its first appearance in two decades in the Top 20 rankings. The Bearcats were seeded fourth in the Midwest Regional. UC defeated its four regional foes by an average margin of 20.8 points to make its sixth appearance in the Final Four. Michigan's "Fab Five" edged UC, 76–72, in the semifinal.
 1999–00 Cincinnati was the nation's top team and Kenyon Martin was college basketball's top player. UC was ranked No. 1 in the national polls for 12 of 18 weeks and Martin made a clean sweep of the national player of the year awards (Naismith, Wooden, Rupp, Robertson, NABC). The Bearcats tied a school record for victories with a 29–4 record and won their fifth straight Conference USA regular season title. UC seemed poised for a run for the national title until Martin suffered a broken leg in the Conference USA tournament. Martin was a unanimous first team All-American with Pete Mickeal earning honorable mention honors. Cincinnati went from the #1 team in the country to a 2-seed in the NCAA tournament, and fell to Tulsa in the 2nd round.
 2001–02 Unranked in the major polls at the start of the season, the Bearcats posted a 31–4 record—setting a new standard for victories—won a seventh consecutive Conference USA regular season championship, captured the C-USA tournament crown and earned their first-ever No. 1 seed in the NCAA tournament. Steve Logan earned his second straight Conference USA Player of the Year award, was a consensus All-American and a finalist for every national player of the year honor. The Bearcats were upset in the 2nd round to 8-seed UCLA in a double-overtime thriller.
 2011–12 After starting the season 5–3 with bad losses and dealing with the aftermath and suspensions from the Crosstown Shootout brawl, UC's season was already on the brinks halfway through December. The Bearcats then went on a run against fantastic competition and wound up beating 8 ranked teams, the most ranked wins in any Cincinnati season in history. The biggest win came against the 31–1 and #2 Syracuse Orange in the Big East tournament semifinals. The Bearcats went on to the Sweet 16 where they lost to Ohio State. The latter half of this season is considered by many to be a big turning point in Mick Cronin's coaching career. 
 2017–18 Cincinnati began the season with high hopes, featuring a team hallmarked by four "1000 point career scorers" (Gary Clark, Jacob Evans, Kyle Washington, and Cane Broome). They spent the entire season in the national polls, peaking at #5 - this was fueled by their defensive prowess which ranked second overall nationally. They earned their first outright American Athletic Conference regular season and tournament championships and tied the school record for wins, going 31–5. Their season ended with a second round NCAA tournament upset to Nevada who tied the record for the 2nd largest NCAA Tournament comeback- surmounting a 22-point deficit to win by 2.

Notable games
01/09/1958 – Cincinnati 118, Seton Hall 54: 19-year-old sophomore Oscar Robertson ("The Big O") dropped 56 points, scoring more than all of Seton Hall, and caught the attention of New York City in a road win. His 56 points, at the time, was a Madison Square Garden record.

03/25/1961 – Cincinnati 70, Ohio State 65: The Buckeyes were the defending champs, 27–0 and No. 1 in the nation. They took on state rival No. 2 Cincinnati in the National Championship. A layup by Ohio State's Bobby Knight sent the game into overtime, tied at 61. Cincy, led by Paul Hogue and Bob Wiesenhahn, took it from there, winning, 70–65, giving the Bearcats their first basketball title in school history.

03/24/1962 – Cincinnati 71, Ohio State 59: Cincinnati and Ohio State, again ranked Nos. 1 and 2 at the end of the regular season, became the first teams to play each other in two consecutive NCAA championship games. Unlike the year before, this game was not close. Cincy led by eight at the half and won by 12 as Paul Hogue and Tom Thacker led the way with 22 and 21 points, respectively. When it was over, the Bearcats' second-year coach Ed Jucker had a pair of NCAA titles in two tries.

03/23/1963 – Loyola (Ill.) 60, Cincinnati 58: Despite its No. 3 ranking and a scoring average of 91.8, nobody expected Loyola of Chicago to beat Cincinnati, especially when the Ramblers fell behind by 15 in the second half. But Loyola rallied to send the game into OT and won the title on a last-second rebound and basket by Vic Rouse.

3/13/1976 – Notre Dame 79, Cincinnati 78: Facing No. 7 Notre Dame in the NCAA tournament, the No. 15 Bearcats had led the entire game and were inbounding under the Irish basket with eight seconds left. The Bearcats were called for a five-second violation, in part for their signal for a timeout being missed by the official. Notre Dame would get the ball and score with two seconds remaining to escape with the victory.

12/21/1981 – Cincinnati 75, Bradley 73: This contest is still listed as the longest game of NCAA Division I history, reaching seven overtimes. Reserve forward Doug Schloemer hit the decisive shot, a left-wing 15-footer with one second remaining in the seventh overtime. If he had missed that jump shot, it would have gone to an eighth overtime.

12/12/1983 – Kentucky 24, Cincinnati 11: It what became known as the "stall game", first year coach Tony Yates had his players go into a four-corner spread and waste the clock. Trying to limit the pain from the No. 2 Wildcats, boos rang out for most of the game and Kentucky refused to reschedule a series with Cincinnati after the end of the contract. This game was a big factor that lead to the introduction of the shot clock for the 1985–86 season.

12/12/1984 – Cincinnati 69, UAB 67: No. 17 UAB had a one-point lead, but in the waning seconds, Tony Wilson, who was on a track scholarship, hit a 54-foot shot beyond half-court at the buzzer to give Cincinnati a 2-point win at Riverfront Coliseum.

11/25/1989 – Cincinnati 66, Minnesota 64: It was the school's first game under Bob Huggins, in their new arena, the Shoemaker Center. Walk-on Steve Sanders, who was also the school's football team's wide receiver for four years, hit the buzzer-beating three-pointer to give UC a 66–64 win over No. 20 Minnesota.

01/23/1993 – Cincinnati 40, UAB 38: The No. 9 Bearcats were heavily favored playing at home vs an 11–7 UAB team. It was an ugly, very low-scoring affair, where UAB led at halftime 15–11. In a tie game with seconds left, Corie Blount for UC had his shot blocked. It was kicked around and Nick Van Exel recovered it to put up a long two-pointer at the buzzer. Nothing but net. Cats won 40–38.

12/17/1994 – Cincinnati 81, Wyoming 80: UC trailed to Wyoming all game, but when down 2 in the final seconds, LaZelle Durden put up a 3-point attempt as the final horn sounded. He was fouled, but hit all three free throws with no time on the clock. UC won, 81–80, and Durden's 45 points were the most by a Bearcat in 34 years.

03/12/1995 – Cincinnati 67, St. Louis 65: LaZelle Durden fired in the game-winning three-pointer with 1.2 seconds to play in the conference championship game over Saint Louis, giving the Bearcats a 67–65 victory and clinching an NCAA Tournament berth.

02/11/1996 – Arizona, 79, Cincinnati 76: The Bearcats had the ball under their own hoop in a tie game vs Arizona with just a few seconds left. Miles Simon stripped the ball from Danny Fortson, and hit a three-quarter-court buzzer-beater to beat UC, 79–76.

02/06/1997 – Cincinnati 65, Tulane 64: The game was tied at 63 with 2 seconds left, and UC had the ball. Bobby Brannan threw the ball the length of the court. Danny Fortson made the catch near the hoop and laid it in with 0.2 seconds remaining. The majority of the Bearcats bench stormed the court in excitement, thinking the game was over. Cincinnati was given a technical foul for the incident, awarding Tulane two free throws and the ball. Honeycutt only made one of two free throws, and Tulane was unable to score with 0.2 seconds left. Cincinnati won by one.

02/19/1998 – Cincinnati 93, UAB 76: All-American Ruben Patterson was awoken at 6:00 in the morning by Bob Huggins. The coach broke the news to him that his mother had a heart attack overnight and died. Patterson played the game that night anyway, after spending all day crying. He scored a career-high 32 points in a 93–76 win over UAB.

03/15/1998 – West Virginia 75, Cincinnati 74: Cincinnati took a 2-point lead with 7.1 seconds remaining against West Virginia in the second round of the NCAA tournament. Jarrod West of WV then banked in a 30-foot three-pointer with 0.8 seconds left, a shot that was tipped by Ruben Patterson. West Virginia advanced to the Sweet Sixteen with a 75–74 win.

11/29/1998 – Cincinnati 77, Duke 75: No. 14 Cincinnati took on No. 1 Duke in the Great Alaska Shootout championship. In a tie game with 3 seconds left, Cincinnati ran a "hook-and-ladder" type play, that had Kenyon Martin hit an open Melvin Levett sprinting towards the hoop. Levett dunked the ball with one second left, and the Bearcats won, 77–75. As of the 2019 season, it is their lone win vs a No. 1 team.

03/02/2000 – Cincinnati 66, DePaul 64: DePaul led the No. 2 Bearcats by 17, and by 10 with under 4 minutes remaining. The National POY Kenyon Martin took over, scoring 5 straight field goals for UC and had 2 key blocks down the stretch. With the game tied at 62, freshman DerMarr Johnson hit the game-winning jumper with 2.7 seconds left.

02/22/2002 – Cincinnati 63, Marquette 62: 9th-ranked Marquette led No. 4 Cincinnati by 4 with 30 seconds remaining. Steve Logan hit a three-pointer with 22 seconds left, then after a missed one-and-one free throw by Dwyane Wade, Donald Little hit a jumper with 3 seconds remaining. Cincinnati won 63–62 in their biggest win of the season.

03/08/2006 – Syracuse 74, Cincinnati 73: In the first round of the Big East tournament, the Bearcats led by one with 8.3 seconds remaining. Devan Downey of UC was at the line shooting two free throws. After making the first, he missed the second. Trailing by 2, Gerry McNamara of Syracuse came down and hit a running one-handed three pointer with 0.5 seconds left, giving Syracuse a one-point win. Cincinnati, who was a bubble team, just barely missed the NCAA tournament (even with a Joe Lunardi prediction of a 9 seed on the morning of Selection Sunday), snapping their streak of 14 straight appearances.

3/11/2010 – West Virginia 54, Cincinnati 51: The Bearcats needed a marquee win to shore up a borderline NCAA tournament at-large profile and they would get the opportunity against #6 West Virginia and their former Coach Bob Huggins in the Big East Quarterfinals. With the score tied, the Bearcats were able to force WVU into a shot clock violation with 6.4 seconds left, giving them the final possession from under the opposing team's baseline. Captain Deonta Vaughn would inbounds to sophomore Dion Dixon, who the Mountaineers were able to overwhelm near halfcourt - causing him to dribble the ball off his leg and out of bounds. On the ensuing possession, tournament MVP Da'Sean Butler would receive the ball with 3.1 seconds left and unleash a highly contested 3 pointer which banked in and sent West Virginia to their eventual Big East tournament championship and the Bearcats to the NIT.

12/10/2011 – Xavier 76, Cincinnati 53: The 2011 rivalry game with Xavier ended in a bench-clearing brawl between the two teams, with the officials calling an end to the game with less than 10 seconds left. For more details, see 2011 Crosstown Shootout brawl.

03/09/2012 – Cincinnati 71, Syracuse 68: Unranked Cincinnati took on No. 2 Syracuse (31–1) in the Big East tournament semifinals. The Bearcats were hot out of the gate, hitting 8 of their first 10 three-point attempts and jumping out to a 25–8 lead. Syracuse came roaring back in the game, getting it to a one-point game with a few seconds left. A Justin Jackson dunk with a second remaining capped the Bearcats 71–68 win, the school's highest-ranked victory since 1998.

03/19/2015 – Cincinnati 66, Purdue 65: 8-seeded Cincinnati and 9-seeded Purdue met for the first time in the NCAA tournament in this round of 64 matchup. In a game that was close the majority of the way, Purdue began to pull away down the stretch. Down 7 with 48 seconds to go, the Bearcats hit a three pointer, forced a turnover, and made an and-one layup, all within 6 seconds to cut it to one. Down two with 7 seconds left, sophomore Troy Caupain drove to the hoop and hit a floater that dramatically spun around the rim, hung on the rim for a second, and fell in, as time expired. In overtime, UC prevailed 66–65, to advance to the round of 32 against an undefeated Kentucky team.

03/11/2016 – UConn 104, Cincinnati 97: In a 4-overtime thriller for the ages, Cincinnati and UConn faced off in the AAC Tournament. In the closing seconds of the 3rd overtime, in a tie game, UC guard Kevin Johnson drained a long 3-pointer with 0.8 seconds left to take a three-point lead. In a desperation heave, Jalen Adams of UConn banked in a 75-footer to extend the game. UConn outscored Cincinnati in the 4th overtime, 16–9, advancing in the conference tournament in which they would end up winning.

03/18/2016 – St. Joe's 78, Cincinnati 76: In the first round of the NCAA tournament, 9-seeded Cincinnati took on 8-seeded St. Joe's. After the Cats clawed back from a second half deficit of 12 points, St. Joe's drained a 3-pointer with under 10 seconds left to take a two-point lead. Cincy guard Troy Caupain drove the length of the floor to the hoop, and got the ball to Octavius Ellis after being swarmed by a double-team. Ellis attempted to quickly slam it home, only to discover his dunk was 0.1 seconds too late. Time expired. St. Joe's advanced.

03/04/2018 – Cincinnati 62, Wichita State 61 : The 10th ranked Bearcats met the 11th ranked Shockers at their home arena on senior night - facing a team that regularly played six seniors - for a chance to win the American Athletic Conference regular season championship outright. In a modern classic under the gaze of a hostile sellout crowd, both squads went back and forth throughout the matchup. Down 1 with 9.3 seconds left under their own basket, Wichita State whipped it around to senior three point ace: Conner Frankamp. UC anticipated the mismatch with sophomore Center Nysier Brooks on the perimeter. Frankamp's potential game-winner missed wide with State corralling the offensive rebound; however, fellow UC sophomore Jarron Cumberland laid down some suffocating defense under the basket, causing their putback to miss off the backside of the backboard as time expired. This gave UC its second regular season AAC title and first outright.

03/11/2018 – Cincinnati 56, Houston 55  : Cincinnati met the nationally ranked Houston Cougars for the third time this season, having split the regular season 1-1. The rubber match came in the finals of the American Athletic Conference tournament, with both schools seeking their first ever AAC tournament title. Gary Clark and company were able to cut down the nets for the first time in their collegiate careers, as Houston's star Rob Gray turned the ball over on the game's final possession.

03/18/2018 – Nevada 75, Cincinnati 73: With the "South bracket" in the 2018 NCAA Division I men's basketball tournament shaping up in Cincinnati's favor, the Bearcats seemed prime for continued March success as they led Nevada by 22 points with 11 minutes remaining. Nevada mounted a furious comeback, scoring 16 straight points over the next 3 minutes. The game continued to be touch and go for the remainder of the half, with an overwhelming amount of foul calls against the Bearcats. With 9 seconds left, Nevada took their first and only lead of the game at 75–73. The Bearcats dribbled the full length of the court but bobbled the ball and never got a clean look as time expired and Nevada tied the second largest comeback to-date in NCAA Tournament history.

03/17/2019 - Cincinnati 69, Houston 57: After being beaten twice by the Cougars in 2019 - the second an embarrassing 85–69 home loss on Senior Day a week earlier that cost them a share of the AAC regular season crown - the Bearcats got a third shot at the outright AAC regular season champs, but were thought to be heavy underdogs against the 31-2 Cougars. After defeating SMU (82-74) and Wichita State (66-63) in the AAC quarterfinals and semifinals respectively, the Bearcats scored a redemptive victory. AAC Player of the year Jarron Cumberland scored 33 points and was named tournament most outstanding player as the Bearcats successfully defended their AAC Tournament Crown and delivered Houston's only double digit loss of the 2018-2019 season.

03/07/2020 - Cincinnati 64, Temple 63: The Bearcats under new coach John Brannen endured an up and down season - epitomized by a Senior Day where they fell behind underdog Temple by as many as 14 points. Fueled by All-AAC players Jarron Cumberland and Trevon Scott, the Bearcats slowly mounted a comeback - tying the game at 54 with 2:03 left. After a hectic 2 minutes, Temple took the lead on a late 3 with 10 seconds remaining. Out of timeouts, Jarron Cumberland drove down the court but his layup ricocheted off the back iron; however, Trevon Scott heroically made a putback layup in the waning seconds to give the Bearcats a dramatic win. The win ultimately shored up the Bearcats' bubbly tournament resume and gave the Bearcats a share of the AAC regular season title.

Rivalries

Xavier

Cincinnati's main basketball rivalry is Xavier University. The two schools play annually in the Skyline Chili Crosstown Shootout. Cincinnati's record in the Shootout is 51–39.

Louisville

UC and Louisville were rivals, first playing in 1921, until the 2010–13 NCAA conference realignment put the contest on hiatus, as Louisville moved to the Atlantic Coast Conference on July 1, 2014. The rivalry has stretched over the span of four conferences from the Missouri Valley Conference, to the Metro Conference to Conference USA, and more recently in the Big East Conference, which in 2013 was renamed to the American Athletic Conference. The teams have faced off 99 times in series history, with Louisville leading the all-time series 53–43. Most notably, Louisville and Cincinnati faced each other twice over the course of the 2011-12 season. UC would upset then No. 17 ranked Louisville at home before facing off again in the 2012 Big East men's basketball tournament championship game, where Louisville would prevail 50–44.

Memphis

First playing in 1968, Cincinnati and Memphis have been longtime conference rivals from the Missouri Valley Conference, to the Metro Conference, Great Midwest Conference, Conference USA, and currently in the American Athletic Conference though Cincinnati is scheduled to leave for the Big 12 Conference in 2023. The teams have faced off 86 times in basketball series history, with Cincinnati leading the all-time series 47–38.

Famously, Cincinnati beat Penny Hardaway's Tigers four times in the 1991–92 season, including in the Elite Eight on the way to the program's sixth Final Four appearance.

Other rivals
UC and Dayton have faced off 91 times, with UC leading the all-time series 60–31. The teams first played in 1907 and would face off regularly, last playing each other in 2010.

Cincinnati also has a longtime rivalry with Miami (OH) having played a total of 148 times since 1904, with UC leading the series 95–53. Similarly to Dayton, the series was played frequently until it came to a halt in 2011. However, for the 2021–22 season the Bearcats announced they would travel to Oxford to play Miami (OH), resuming the series for the first time in a decade, winning 59–58.

Postseason history

NCAA Tournament seeding history

NCAA tournament results
The Bearcats have appeared in the NCAA tournament 33 times. Their combined record is 46–32. They have been to six Final Fours, including five in a row from 1959 to 1963, and are two time National Champions (1961, 1962). UC has been to the Sweet Sixteen six times since 1967, with its last Sweet Sixteen appearance in 2012.

NIT results
The Bearcats have appeared in the NIT 11 times. Their combined record is 9–10, most notably placing 3rd  in 1955.

CBI results
The Bearcats have appeared in the College Basketball Invitational once.

Record vs. Big 12 Conference Opponents
This table reflects the results of match-ups between Cincinnati and BIG 12 Conference opponents.

Updated through the end of the 2022-23 NCAA Division I men's basketball season.

Source

Awards

Player of the Year Awards
 1959, 1960 – Oscar Robertson, USBWA College Player of the Year
 2000 – Kenyon Martin, Consensus National Player of the Year (USBWA, AP, Naismith, Wooden, Rupp)

All-Americans
Cincinnati has had 31 different players receive All-American honors while at UC. The award has been given to a Consensus 1st-Team All-American 8 times.

Consensus 1st Team All-Americans
 1958, 1959, 1960 – Oscar Robertson
 1963 – Ron Bonham
 1963 – Tom Thacker
 1997 – Danny Fortson
 2000 – Kenyon Martin
 2002 – Steve Logan

Consensus 2nd Team, 3rd Team, Freshmen and Honorable Mention All-Americans

 1948, 1949, 1950 – Dick Dallmer
 1955 – Jack Twyman
 1958 – Connie Dierking
 1960 – Ralph Davis
 1961 – Bob Wiesenhahn
 1961, 1962 – Paul Hogue
 1962, 1963 – Tony Yates
 1963 – George Wilson
 1964 – Ron Bonham
 1967 – Mike Rolf
 1970 – Jim Ard
 1973, 1974 – Lloyd Batts
 1976 – Steve Collier
 1977 – Gary Yoder
 1978 – Bob Miller

 1979 – Pat Cummings
 1992 – Herb Jones
 1993 – Nick Van Exel
 1994 – Dontonio Wingfield
 1995, 1996 – Danny Fortson
 1998 – Bobby Brannen
 1998 – Ruben Patterson
 1999 – Melvin Levett
 1999 – Kenyon Martin
 2000 – DerMarr Johnson
 2000 – Pete Mickeal
 2001 – Steve Logan
 2014 – Sean Kilpatrick 
 2018 – Gary Clark 
 2019 – Jarron Cumberland

Conference Player of the Year

Conference Tournament MVP

Naismith Hall of Fame Members
The following Cincinnati coaches and players have been enshrined in the Naismith Memorial Basketball Hall of Fame.

Olympians
The following Cincinnati players have represented their country in basketball in the Summer Olympic Games:

McDonald's All-Americans
The following were McDonald's All-Americans in high school that committed to, and played for, the University of Cincinnati.

(**) Originally played collegiate basketball elsewhere, but transferred to Cincinnati.

Mr. Basketball Winners 
The following were Mr. Basketball winners in high school that committed to, and played for, the University of Cincinnati.

Retired numbers

1,000-point scorers
The Bearcats currently have 56
players in their 1,000-point club.

Bearcats in the NBA
The Bearcats have had 38 players play in the NBA, spanning seven decades, as of 2023.

Bearcats in international leagues

Sean Kilpatrick (born 1990), basketball player for Hapoel Jerusalem of the Israeli Basketball Super League

Fifth Third Arena

The Bearcats have played their home games in Fifth Third Arena since 1989. The arena is on-campus and has a capacity of 12,012 (with room for overflow). It is located in the Myrl H. Shoemaker Center, which was also the name of the arena until 2005, when it was named for Cincinnati-based Fifth Third Bank. It is still popularly known as "The Shoe". The Bearcats held a 42-game home win streak from 1997 to 2000. In the 1999–2000 season, every Bearcat home game was sold out. During the Bob Huggins era, it was known as one of the most hostile arenas in the nation due to the high decibel levels typical of his tenure.

On December 15, 2015, The UC Board of Trustees approved an $87-million, privately funded renovation of Fifth Third Arena. Proposed improvements to the facility, include the creation of a 360-degree seating bowl, new HD scoreboard, ribbon boards, sound system, an LED lighting system which will allow for enhanced gameday presentation, new restroom and concession facilities, a new upper-level concourse with its own fan amenities, expanded food and beverage options and a new main entrance and plaza with centralized ticketing and guest services. Construction began in April 2017 and was completed in fall 2018. During the 2017–18 school year, men's basketball home games were moved to BB&T Arena at Northern Kentucky University in Highland Heights, Kentucky, while women's basketball and volleyball home games were moved to the campus of St. Ursula Academy. The Bearcats christened the newly renovated arena in a rare home game vs. Ohio State on November 7, 2018.

The Bearcats have a 439–92 overall record in Fifth Third Arena as of the 2021–22 season.

See also
 University of Cincinnati
 Cincinnati Bearcats
 Fifth Third Arena
 Wes Miller
 NCAA Men's Division I Final Four appearances by coaches

References

External links